Evocalcet (trade name Orkedia) is a drug for the treatment of hyperparathyroidism.  It acts as a calcium-sensing receptor agonist.

In 2018, it was approved in Japan for treatment of secondary hyperparathyroidism in patients on dialysis.

References 

Carboxylic acids
1-Naphthyl compounds
Pyrrolidines